Nash is a village and community to the south of the city of Newport, South Wales, in the Lliswerry ward.

Origin of the name 
The name is thought to originate from a contraction of "An Ash" (tree), meaning literally `place of the ash tree(s)'. This is supported by its appearance in deeds as "De Fraxino" (fraxinus was the Latin name for the ash tree).

The Welsh name is Trefonnen, given in older sources as Tre'r onnen, also meaning Town (tref) of the Ash (onnen).

Nash and nearby Goldcliff, as Nash and Goldcliffe, are two of the few villages to appear on the Cambriae Typus map of 1573.

Location 
In addition to the village itself, the parish contains Uskmouth power stations and part of the Newport Wetlands nature reserve, including its Visitors Centre which was opened in 2008.

The City of Newport campus of Coleg Gwent (commonly referred to as 'Nash College') is actually in the neighbouring parish of Lliswerry.

Together with the neighbouring parishes of Goldcliff and Whitson, Nash is one of the "Three Parishes" which have long been treated as a unit – geographical, socially, economically and ecclesiastically.

The parish is bounded to the south by the sea (Bristol Channel) to the east by the lower reaches of the River Usk and to the north by Lliswerry and the Llanwern Steelworks site. To the east lie Goldcliff and Whitson.

History 
In 1901 the only four private residents are listed as Mrs Morgan at "Greenfield", Mrs Morgan at "The Elms", Rev. C. W. Triton (Baptist minister, but curiously no separate residence given) and Miss Ester Wilcox at "Decoy Pool". Some twenty nine commercial interests include mostly farmers (22) but also William German, blacksmith and wheelwright, at "Pye Corner", Mrs Sarah Jones, publican at "Waterloo Inn", John Skuse, shop-keeper at Broadstreet Common, Edward Tamplin butcher at "Box Cottage", David Thomas farm bailiff to Mr. James Thomas at "Pye Corner Farm", John Watkins, butcher and Lewis Williams, mason at "Ash Cottage".

A large part of the village, including Farmfield House, was lost in the construction of the Uskmouth power station and the adjoining huge ash-pits in 1959. Although the main part of the village centres around the church in West Nash, much of the village is set along the wide Broadstreet Common, accessed via Pye Corner or Straits Lane, and which provides the more direct route to Whitson and Redwick. For many years the German family were the village blacksmiths at Pye Corner with the premises eventually becoming a petrol station. The site is now occupied by the offices of the Caldicot and Wentloog Levels Internal Drainage Board. The village had its own small infant school, built in 1877  on West Nash Road. It closed in  the early 1980s and has now been converted into a private dwelling.

The Church 
The Church of St Mary in West Nash, dating originally from the 12th century, is an important Grade I listed church, notable for its fine tower and spire and has been called "the Cathedral of the Moors". The church belonged to Goldcliff Priory in 1349 when Robert Arney was instituted to the benefice. The Arney family, in the time of Charles II, left a cottage and six acres of land, called "The Poor's Six Acres", for the support of the poor of the parish.

The church was largely rebuilt during the 16th century.

The only remains of the Norman church is the North Wall of the chancel and the squint. An unusual feature, the squint or hagioscope was used to enable those with leprosy, smallpox or other such diseases, to see or participate in the service without endangering the rest of the congregation with infection. The tower is unusually located on the north side of the chancel. The church is thought to originally have been much larger, incorporating a North aisle.

In the early years of the 20th century the floor of the bellringer's room was used as a temporary mortuary for the bodies of five sailors who had been drowned at sea, in a violent storm, near the East Usk Lighthouse. Four of the sailors had been found lashed to the mast. During World War II the church saw congregations of 400. The interior, following restoration in 2004–2005, is notable for its complete set of 18th century furnishings, with box pews, a three-decker pulpit and a western gallery. In the fields to the south of the neighbouring Church Farm are ancient tumuli, the vestiges of some ancient, possibly mediæval, dwelling or chapel.

Baptist chapel 

At Pye Corner is the former Baptist chapel.

When Lliswerry Baptist Church opened in 1889, some of the congregation found it more convenient to attend there. The same year that Lliswerry was incorporated into Newport under the provisions of the Newport (Mon.) Corporation Act, 1889. The chapel at Nash contained a covered immersion baptismal font and a pedal organ built and played by Alfred W. Haime, master baker, of Earlswood, Shirenewton.

A steady decline in attendances at Nash led to only five remaining members in 1988 and the chapel closed some time afterwards. In 2006 a planning application was made to Newport City Council to convert the building into a dwelling house with vehicular access. It is now in private ownership.

Amenities 

To the north of church, at the end of St. Mary's Road, The Waterloo public house is a tenanted free-house notable for the fact it is owned by the parish council. A modern Community Hall has been built nearby.

Located at the edge of the Newport Wetlands Reserve, East Usk Lighthouse  provides a notable landmark. Parts of Nash are designated a Site of Special Scientific Interest SSSI.

The village enjoys a regular public bus service provided by Crossgates Coaches. The local newspaper is the South Wales Argus which is published in Newport.

In October 2009 the village skyline was transformed with the installation of two 2.5-megawatt wind turbines, on the site of chemical company Solutia UK Ltd, which will supply up to one-third of the facility's electricity needs.

Present-day Nash 

Several road schemes have proposed a southern relief motorway loop for Newport, as a way of mitigating the congestion of the existing M4 motorway. Many of these schemes have involved intrusion, to a greater or lesser extent, into Nash. As a result Nash Community Council became a member of the "Campaign Against the Levels Motorway" (CALM) Alliance formed to oppose such schemes by the Friends of the Earth Cymru. The bypass scheme was eventually cancelled in July 2009.

In June 2010 a public meeting was held at the village Community Centre to discuss proposals for a waste incinerator in Newport. Members of the "Stop Newport Incinerator Campaign (SNIC)" organised the meeting to explain to residents the possible development on Bowleaze Common land south of Llanwern steelworks.

Government 
The area is governed by the Newport City Council and the Nash, Newport community council. The village falls within the Llanwern ward of the Newport East parliamentary constituency.

References

This article contains public domain material from J. A. Bradney's History of Monmouthshire (1904).

External links
Nash Community Council
Nash at genuki.org

Communities in Newport, Wales
Districts of Newport, Wales
Villages in Newport, Wales